Diana Julie Harris (26 March 1921 – 30 May 2015) was an English costume designer. She won an Academy Award for her work in the film Darling (1965) and a BAFTA Award for her work in the film The Wrong Box (1966).

Career
Born in London in 1921, Harris began her career in 1947 at Gainsborough Pictures with Holiday Camp, the forerunner of the Huggett family film series.  During her early career, she was mentored by Elizabeth Haffenden, and went on to work for the Rank Organisation, until that studio wound down its business in the 1950s.

Over the next 30 years, she worked with actors such as Jayne Mansfield, Joan Crawford, Bette Davis, Lauren Bacall and Alan Ladd and directors Alfred Hitchcock, Joseph Losey, Billy Wilder and John Schlesinger. She made a "mink bikini" (actually made out of rabbit fur) for Diana Dors.  She worked steadily on feature films throughout the next three decades, hitting her stride in the 1960s, before shifting her attention to television movies until her retirement in 1991.

Harris won the Oscar for Best Costume Design for Darling in 1965, and the BAFTA Award for Best Costume Design for The Wrong Box in 1967. She also worked on the Beatles' first two live action feature films, A Hard Day's Night (1964), and Help! (1965), quipping that  "I must be one of the few people who can claim they have seen John, Paul, George and Ringo naked." She also worked on the James Bond films Live and Let Die and Rollerball with Roger Moore, and the spoof Casino Royale with David Niven  Harris also designed costumes for the Carry On film Carry On Cleo (1964), a sword and sandal spoof set in ancient Rome and Egypt, described as "perhaps the best" of the series.

Harris died after a brief illness from a chest infection, aged 94, on 30 May 2015.

Notable credits
Another Man's Poison (1951)
The Story of Esther Costello (1957) 
Swiss Family Robinson (1960) 
All Night Long (1961)
The Chalk Garden (1964)
A Hard Day's Night (1964)
Carry On Cleo (1964)
Help! (1965)
Darling (1965)
The Wrong Box (1966) 
Casino Royale (1967)
The Whisperers (1967)
Prudence and the Pill (1968)  
Goodbye, Mr. Chips (1969)
The Private Life of Sherlock Holmes (1970)
Live and Let Die (1973) 
Rollerball (1975) 
The Land That Time Forgot (1975)
The Slipper and the Rose (1976)
Candleshoe (1977)
Dracula (1979) 
The Great Muppet Caper (1981)

Awards and nominations

Academy Awards

British Academy Film Awards

Saturn Awards

References
 Harper, Sue, Women in British Cinema: Mad, Bad, and Dangerous to Know. London: Continuum International Publishing Group 2000. , pp. 215–16

Further reading

External links
 

1921 births
2015 deaths
English costume designers
Women costume designers
Best Costume Design Academy Award winners
Best Costume Design BAFTA Award winners
People from London
Infectious disease deaths in England